Donald Young was the defending champion but decided not to participate.
Tim Smyczek won the title, when Frank Dancevic retired in the final after losing the first set 5–7.

Seeds

Draw

Finals

Top half

Bottom half

References
 Main Draw
 Qualifying Draw

2012 ATP Challenger Tour
2012 Singles